Mellac  is a commune in the Finistère department of Brittany in north-western France.

Population
Inhabitants of Mellac are called in French Mellacois.

Geography

Historically, Mellac belongs to Cornouaille. The river Isole forms the commune's northern and eastern borders.

Neighboring communes

Mellac is border by Saint-Thurien and Querrien to the north, by Tréméven to the east, by Quimperlé and Baye to the south and by Le Trévoux and Bannalec to the west.

Map

History
The oldest surviving parish registers date back to 1562.

Gallery

See also
Communes of the Finistère department

References

External links

  Cultural Heritage 
Mayors of Finistère Association ;

Communes of Finistère